"Mind your own business" is a common English saying which asks for a respect of other people's privacy. It strongly suggests that a person should stop interfering in what does not affect themselves. Contextually, it is often used in an argument or dispute as a remark to refute, reject, disregard, or discourage others' concerns or comments. Its acronym is MYOB.

Origin
The phrase appears in St. Paul's first letter to the Thessalonians in the fourth chapter:11 'that you also aspire to lead a quiet life, to mind your own business, and to work with your own hands, as we commanded you'.Some modern theologians do not believe that the phrase "Mind your own business" is of direct biblical derivation, though something similar appears in the Bible where St. Paul tells the church of Thessaloniki about this manner of living in his instructions as a way of Christian life (I Thessalonians 4:11). The Greek phrase is πράσσειν τὰ ἴδια, which translates as "manage yourself".

The first of coins, minted by the United States under The Coinage Act of 1792, display the words “Mind Your Business” on one side.

20th century
In the 1930s, a slang version rendered the saying as "Mind your own beeswax". It is meant to soften the force of the retort. Folk etymology has it that this idiom was used in the colonial period when women would sit by the fireplace making wax candles together, though there are many other theories.

In the classic science fiction story "...And Then There Were None", author Eric Frank Russell shortened "Mind your own business" to "MYOB" or "Myob!", which was used as a form of civil disobedience on the planet of the libertarian Gands. Russell's short story was subsequently incorporated into his 1962 novel The Great Explosion.

See also 
 A wigwam for a goose's bridle
 Bodily integrity
 Fugio cent, a coin designed by Benjamin Franklin that bears the motto "Mind your business"
 Personal boundaries

References

External links
 Theidioms.com, Origins of common sayings - Mind Your Own Beeswax
 Abelard.org, And Then There Were None (relevant excerpt of The Great Explosion)

English phrases